Puthandu, also known as Puthuvarudam, and the Tamil New Year, is the first day of year on the Tamil calendar, traditionally celebrated as a festival by Tamil Hindus. The festival date is set with the solar cycle of the lunisolar Hindu calendar, as the first day of the Tamil month Chittirai. It falls on or about 14 April every year on the Gregorian calendar. The same day is observed elsewhere in South and South East Asia as the traditional new year, but is known by other names such as Vishu in Kerala, and Vaisakhi or Baisakhi in central and northern India.

On this day, Tamil people greet each other by saying "Puttāṇṭu vāḻttukaḷ!" or "Iṉiya puttāṇṭu nalvāḻttukaḷ!", which is equivalent to "Happy new year". The day is observed as a family time. Households clean up the house, prepare a tray with fruits, flowers and auspicious items, light up the family puja altar and visit their local temples. People wear new clothes and children go to elders to pay their respects and seek their blessings, then the family sits down to a vegetarian feast.

Puthandu is also celebrated by Tamil Hindus outside Tamil Nadu and Puducherry, such as in Sri Lanka, Malaysia, Singapore, Reunion, Mauritius and other countries with Tamil diaspora.

Origin and significance

The Tamil New Year follows the spring equinox and generally falls on 14 April of the Gregorian year. The day celebrates on the first day of the traditional Tamil calendar and is a public holiday in both Tamil Nadu and Sri Lanka. The same date is observed as the traditional new year in Assam, West Bengal, Kerala, Tripura, Bihar, Odisha, Punjab, Himachal Pradesh, Haryana, as well as in Nepal and Bangladesh. Myanmar, Cambodia, Laos, Thailand, and Tamils in Sri Lanka also celebrate the same day as their new year, likely an influence of the shared culture between South and Southeast Asia in the 1st millennium CE.

There are several references in early Tamil literature to the April new year. Nakkirar, Sangam period author of the Neṭunalvāṭai, wrote that the sun travels from Mesha/Chittirai through 11 successive signs of the zodiac. Kūdalūr Kiḻār refers to Mesha Raasi/Chittirai as the commencement of the year in the Puṟanāṉūṟu. The Tolkaapiyam is the oldest surviving Tamil grammar that divides the year into six seasons where Chittirai marks the start of the Ilavenil season or summer.  The Silappadikaaram mentions the 12 Raasis or zodiac signs starting with Mesha/Chittirai. The Manimekalai alludes to the Hindu solar calendar as we know it today. Adiyarkunalaar, an early medieval commentator or Urai-asiriyar mentions the twelve months of the Tamil calendar with particular reference to Chittirai. There were subsequent inscriptional references in Pagan, Burma dated to the 11th century CE and in Sukhothai, Thailand dated to the 14th century CE to South Indian, often Vaishnavite, courtiers who were tasked with defining the traditional calendar that began in mid-April.

Celebration

Tamil people celebrate Puthandu, also called Puthuvarusham, as the traditional "Tamil/Hindu New Year", states Peter Reeves. This is the month of Chittirai, the first month of the Tamil solar calendar, and Puthandu typically falls on 14 April. In some parts of Southern Tamil Nadu, the festival is called Chittirai Vishu. On the eve of Puthandu, a tray arranged with three fruits (mango, banana and jack fruit), betel leaves and arecanut, gold/silver jewellery, coins/money, flowers and a mirror. This is similar to the Vishu new year festival ceremonial tray in Kerala. According to the Tamil tradition, this festive tray is auspicious as the first sight upon waking on the new year day. Home entrances are decorated elaborately with colored rice powder. These designs are called kolams.

In the temple city of Madurai, the Chittirai Thiruvizha is celebrated in the Meenakshi Temple. A huge exhibition is held, called Chittirai Porutkaatchi. On the day of the Tamil New Year, a big Car Festival is held at Tiruvidaimarudur near Kumbakonam. Festivals are also held at Tiruchirapalli, Kanchipuram and other places.

Sri Lankan Tamils observe the traditional new year in April with the first financial transaction known as the Kai-vishesham. In this transaction children go to elders to pay their respect, and elders give their blessings and gift pocket money to the children in return. The event is also observed with the 'arpudu' or the first ploughing of the ground to prepare for the new agricultural cycle. The game of 'por-thenkai' or coconut wars between youth is played in villages through the Tamil north and east of the island while cart races are also held. The festive Puthandu season in April is a time for family visits and the renewal of filial bonds. It coincides with the Sinhalese new year season.

Later in the day, families enjoy a feast. A special dish called Mangai-pachadi is prepared from a variety of flavors, similar to pacchadi of new year foods of Ugadi and Vishu. It is made from sweet jaggery, astringent mustard, sour raw mango, bitter neem, and red chilies. These complex dish is ritually tasted by Tamils, as similar multi-flavors are by Hindus elsewhere on the new year. Such traditional festive recipes, that combine different flavors, are a symbolic reminder that one must expect all flavors of experiences in the coming new year, that no event or episode is wholly sweet or bitter, experiences are transitory and ephemeral, and to make the most from them.

In Malaysia and Singapore, Tamils join Sikhs, Malayalees and Bengalis to celebrate the traditional new year in mid-April with leaders across the political spectrum wishing the ethnic Indian community for the new year. Special religious events are held in Hindu temples, in Tamil community centers and Gurdwaras. Cultural programs and media events also take place. It's a day of celebration for the Indian community.

Controversy

The Dravida Munnetra Kazhagam (DMK)-led Government of Tamil Nadu had declared in 2008 that the Tamil new year should be celebrated on the first day of Tamil month of Thai (14 January) coinciding with the harvest festival of Pongal. The Tamil Nadu New Year (Declaration Bill 2008) was enacted as the state law by the DMK assembly members and its Tamil Nadu Government on 29 January 2008. This law of the DMK majority-led government was subsequently rescinded by a separate act of legislation in the Tamil Nadu Assembly with an AIADMK majority-led government on 23 August 2011. Many in Tamil Nadu ignored the DMK government legislation that rescheduled the festival date, and continued the celebration of their traditional Puthandu new year festival in mid-April. The Governor and Chief Minister of the Indian Union Territory of Puducherry, which has an ethnic Tamil majority, felicitated the public for the Tamil new year in April 2010. 
 
The legislative reach to change the traditional religious new year by the DMK government was questioned by Hindu priests and Tamil scholars. The law was met with resistance by Tamils in the state and elsewhere. It was also challenged in court. The then opposition All India Anna Dravida Munnetra Kazhagam (AIADMK) and Marumalarchi Dravida Munnetra Kazhagam (MDMK) in Tamil Nadu subsequently condemned the decision of the DMK Government in that state and urged their supporters to continue celebrating the traditional date in mid-April. Tamils in Sri Lanka, Singapore, Malaysia and Canada continued to observe the new year in mid-April.

The previous state government in Tamil Nadu in an effort to placate popular sentiment announced that the same day will be celebrated as a new festival renamed as "Chittirai Tirunal" (the festival of Chittirai). The day remained a public holiday in Tamil Nadu under the DMK government, but not as Tamil new year, but purportedly to commemorate Dr. B.R Ambedkar, who was the Chairman of the Drafting Committee of Indian Constitution. All television channels in Tamil Nadu, including the pro-DMK Sun TV, continued to telecast festive "Chittirai Tirunal Special Programs" on 14 April 2010. The leader of the AIADMK, Jayalalitha refused to recognize the repackaged festival, and felicitated the Tamil people for the traditional Tamil New Year. The MDMK leader Vaiko, followed suit. The controversy between the two dates subsided, the official celebrations during the traditional new year in April revived and the public holiday was restored as the Tamil New Year.

Related festivals
Puthandu is celebrated elsewhere in India under different names commemorating the solar new year. Some examples include:

Vishu in Kerala
Vaisakhi in Punjab, Haryana, Himachal Pradesh, NCT of Delhi, Uttar Pradesh, Uttarakhand, Rajasthan, Bihar, Jharkhand, Madhya Pradesh and Chhattisgarh
Pana Sankranti in Odisha
Pohela Boishakh in West Bengal and Tripura
Rongali Bihu in Assam

However, this is not the universal new year for all Hindus. For some, such as those in Gujarat, the new year festivities coincide with the five-day Diwali festival. New Year celebrations in Karnataka, Andhra Pradesh and Telangana's Ugadi & Maharashtra and Goa's Gudi Padwa, falls a few weeks before Puthandu.

South Asia and Southeast Asia

The same day every year is the new year for many Buddhist communities in parts of Southeast Asia such as Myanmar, Sri Lanka and Cambodia, likely an influence of their shared culture in the 1st millennium CE.

According to a 1957 publication by Gunasegaram, the new year celebrated in Sri Lanka, Cambodia and Champa (Vietnam) is the Tamil New Year with roots in the practices of Mohenjo-daro (Indus Valley civilization). According to Nanacuriyan, this may be from the medieval era Tamil influence in Southeast Asia.

According to Jean Michaud and other scholars, the new year celebration traditions in Southeast Asian Massif have two roots. One is China, and this influence is found for example in Vietnam and southeastern China. These Sino-influenced communities celebrate the new year in the first or second lunar month after the winter solstice in December. The second group of people in the Massif celebrate the new year in mid April, much like most of India. This group consists of northeastern Indians, northeastern Myanmar, Tai speakers of Thailand, Laos, northern Vietnam and southern Yunnan. The festival is celebrated in the Massif in some ways unlike Puthandu. It is marked by an occasion to visit family and friends, splashing others with water (like Holi), drinking alcohol, as well as later wearing jewelry, new clothes and socializing. The new year festival is called regionally by different names:

Vaisakhi in Pakistan and Afghanistan
Bikram Samwat / Vaishak Ek in Nepal
Pohela Boishakh in Bangladesh
Aluth Avuruthu (Sinhalese New Year) in Sri Lanka 
Chol Chnam Thmey in Cambodia
Songkan / Pi Mai Lao in Laos
Songkran in Thailand
Thingyan in Myanmar

See also
Tamil culture

References

External links
 சித்திரையில் தொடங்கும் புது வருடம் – 1

Festivals in India
New Year in India
New Year celebrations
April observances
Festivals in Tamil Nadu
Public holidays in Sri Lanka
Tamil festivals